St Mary's is a Gaelic Athletic Association club based in the western ward of Sligo, County Sligo, Republic of Ireland.

History
The club was formed in 1976 from the amalgamation of the Craobh Rua and Muire Naofa clubs. It is the only Sligo club to have won the Connacht Senior Club Football Championship, winning three titles. As well as that, they are the only team to have won the county minor, U-21 and senior championship in Sligo in the same season, having done so in 1985 and 2015. They have also won eleven senior county titles.

Notable players
Tommy Breheny – led Sligo as manager to a rare Connacht Senior Football Championship in 2007
Mark Breheny – younger brother of Tommy, was one of Sligo's main players at that time

Peter Ford

Emlyn Mulligan
Barnes Murphy – All Star: 1974

Notable managers
 Cyril Haran

Honours

 Connacht Senior Club Football Championship: (3)
 1977, 1980, 1983
 All-Ireland Football Sevens Championship: (1)
 1980
 Sligo Senior Football Championship: (11)
 1977, 1979, 1980, 1981, 1983, 1984, 1985, 1987, 1996, 2001, 2015, 
 Sligo Junior Football Championship: (4)
 1993, 1996, 2000, 2014
 Sligo Junior B Football Championship: (2)
 1998 2019
 Sligo Under 20 Football Championship: (8)
 1985, 1986, 2000, 2012, 2013, 2015, 2016, 2018
 Sligo Minor Football Championship: (11)
 1983, 1984, 1985, 1986, 1987, 1997, 2011, 2012, 2013, 2014, 2015
 Sligo Under-16 Football Championship: (15)
 1978, 1980, 1982, 1983, 1984, 1985, 1987, 1995, 1997, 2004, 2010, 2011, 2012, 2013, 2015
 Sligo Under-14 Football Championship: (7)
 1976, 1978, 1979, 1988, 2002, 2008, 2011
 Sligo Senior Football League (Division 1): (7)
 1977, 1978, 1979, 1982, 1983, 1988, 2014
 Sligo Senior Football League (Division 2): (1)
 2010
 Sligo Senior Football League (Division 3): (1)
 2014
 Sligo Intermediate Football League (Division 4): (2)
 2013, 2019
 Sligo Junior Football League (Division 5): (2)
 1987, 1996
 Kiernan Cup: (5)
 1980, 1983, 1987, 2008, 2010

References

External links
Official Website

Gaelic games clubs in County Sligo
Sport in Sligo (town)